The 1921 Wake Forest Baptists football team was an American football team that represented Wake Forest University during the 1921 college football season. In its second season under head coach James L. White, the team compiled a 2–8 record.

Schedule

References

Wake Forest
Wake Forest Demon Deacons football seasons
Wake Forest Baptists football